Nathan Wright is a British actor.

Background 
Nathan Wright grew up in Dudley (England). He became interested in acting while he was still a child. He took part in plays at primary and secondary school. In Dudley he took part in an amateur drama alongside his grandfather and established his determination to become an actor. Wright was trained as an actor at the Arts Ed in London. He graduated in 2009. In 2010 he appeared as Orlando in the play As You Like It  at the West Yorkshire Playhouse in Leeds. In the same year Wright got the role of the recurring character Hugh in the TV series Being Human. Later that year Wright appeared the first time as Josh Mathers in the British television series Doctors. He played another guest character in 2011, before getting the role of the main character Chris Reid in 2012. He left the series in 2014. For his role as Chris Reid he got two nominations for the British Soap Awards as sexiest male. In 2015 Wright played the character Robert in the second series of The Musketeers and Colin Pitchfork in episode two of Code of a Killer. In 2017 he appeared as Mike Anderson in the horror film Where the Skin Lies.

Filmography

Film

Television

Theatre

Awards and nominations

Nomination 
British Soap Awards
 2013: Sexiest Male
 2014: Sexiest Male

External links

References 

Living people
1979 births
British male television actors
People educated at the Arts Educational Schools